Kalbajar is a city and the capital of the Kalbajar District of Azerbaijan.

The city had a population of 7,246 before its capture by Armenian forces on 2 April 1993, during the First Nagorno-Karabakh War, which resulted in all of the city's population being expelled, after which the city was repopulated by ethnic Armenians.

The city, alongside the surrounding district, was returned to Azerbaijan on 25 November 2020 per the ceasefire agreement that ended the 2020 Nagorno-Karabakh war.

Etymology 
There are several theories about the origin of the town's name. According to one of the versions, the city was originally called Kevlicher, meaning "fortress in the upper reaches of the rivers" (kevli – "the upper reaches of the river," cher/jar – "fortress") in Old Turkic. According to another version, the name of the town comes from the combination of the Persian word kevil ("cave") and the Turkic word jer ("rock, ravine") and means "ravine with caves". This etymology is explained by the fact that there are a number of artificial caves along the Tartar River valley, where the town is located. Another version proposes that the name comes from the Turkic words kevli ("river mouths") and jar ("gorge, ravine"), and that the settlement was originally called Keblajar, but over time the name purportedly morphed to Kalbajar.

According to Armenian sources, the name Kalbajar is a modified form of Karavachar/Karvachar. The Armenian name is popularly interpreted as meaning "a place for selling rocks", as if consisting of the elements kar – "rock" and vachar – "sale, selling". Other possible etymologies consider kar to mean "fortress" in this case or to be prefix meaning settlement found in the names of some ancient Near Eastern cities.

History

Early history 
In ancient times, the territory where modern-day Kalbajar is located was part of the county (gavar) of Tsar of the Artsakh province within the Kingdom of Armenia. From the 9th to 16th centuries, it was part of the Armenian Principality of Khachen and following its collapse, the Armenian melikdom of Jraberd, one of the five Melikdoms of Karabakh. Archaeological evidence uncovered in 1924 by Soviet archaeologist and scholar of the Caucasus Evgenia Pchelina attests to the existence of an Armenian settlement in the area during the middle ages.

The settlement is mentioned by Armenian sources in the 15th century as the village of Karavachar (17th-century and later Armenian sources spell it Karvachar). It is first mentioned in the colophon of an Armenian manuscript dated to 1402: 

According to Armenian historian Samvel Karapetyan, its population likely consisted of Armenians until the 1730s. In the mid-18th century, Kalbajar was again incorporated into the province of Khachen as a part of the newly-formed Karabakh Khanate. In the mid-19th century, the area was settled by Kurds, and the settlement's name was distorted from Kar(a)vachar to Kyarvajar or Kyalbajar. Kurdish folk tales from the region, recorded by Pchelina, speak of the arrival of the Kurds in the region and the subsequent displacement of the historical Armenian population.

Red Kurdistan 

The city was part of the Kurdistansky Uyezd (later called the Kurdistan Okrug) of the Azerbaijani SSR from 7 July 1923 to 23 July 1930. To its Kurdish population, it was known as Kevn Bajar.

Battle of Kalbajar 

The city was seized by Armenian forces on 2 April 1993 during the Battle of Kalbajar, near the end of the First Nagorno-Karabakh War and all of its Azerbaijani inhabitants were forced out. Civilians reported being forced to flee through mountains still covered in snow, resulting in hundreds freezing to death.

Human Rights Watch findings concluded that during the Kalbajar offensive Armenian forces committed numerous violations of the rules of war, including forcible exodus of civilian population, indiscriminate fire and hostage-taking. In April 1993, the United Nations Security Council  adopted Resolution 822 which called for the withdrawal of all occupying forces from the Kalbajar district, including the town of Kalbajar.

Armenian occupation 
Following the war, the city and surrounding territory were absorbed into the breakaway Republic of Artsakh becoming the centre of its Shahumyan Province and was renamed . Starting in the early 2000s, the city was slowly repopulated by ethnic Armenians from the eastern areas of Shahumyan and Gulistan; they had fled during the First Nagorno-Karabakh War after they had been forcefully expelled by Azerbaijani forces and the aforementioned settlements had been taken under control by Azerbaijan.

Infrastructure was thereafter rebuilt and the town had electricity and a nearby highway connecting it to Armenia. In 2018, the town's school had 177 schoolchildren.

An OSCE Fact-Finding Mission visited the occupied territories in 2005 to inspect settlement activity in the area and report its findings to the Co-Chairs of the OSCE Minsk Group. According to FFM figures, at that time the number of Armenian settlers in the Kalbajar District was approximately 1,500, of which about 450–500 lived in Kalbajar proper. FFM reported that "housing conditions were basic and no more than 20 to 30 percent of the ruins were reconstructed, usually in a crude and make-shift manner. Some were without glass windows and were only heated by a small wood-burning stove". According to 2013 local estimates, which the historian and political scientist Laurence Broers considers plausible, the city had some 700 inhabitants at the time while the larger, namesake district had a total of 3,000 inhabitants.

From 2014 to 2020, the city maintained ties with Pico Rivera, California as a friendship city.

Return to Azerbaijani control 
As part of an agreement that ended the 2020 Nagorno-Karabakh war, the town and its surrounding district were initially to be returned to Azerbaijani control by 15 November 2020, but this deadline was subsequently extended to 25 November 2020. The city, along with the district were returned to Azerbaijan on 25 November 2020.

Following the end of the 2020 Nagorno-Karabakh war, Armenian armed forces and civilians began to leave the Kalbajar area on 11 November 2020 in preparation for the handover of the town to Azerbaijani control on 15 November 2020. It was reported that some residents were burning their own homes, schools and forests and were cutting fruit trees and downing power lines prior to the handover. In the days leading up to the return to Azerbaijani control, there was heavy traffic on the road leading into the area as residents rushed to leave while other Armenians rushed to visit the nearby 9th century Dadivank monastery one last time before the border closed.

According to Donatella Rovera, Amnesty International's senior crisis adviser, who traveled to Kalbajar soon after it was returned to Azerbaijan's control, "during 27 years of occupation all was looted – not a door, nor a window, not a single roof tile was left in the houses of the Azerbaijanis who had to flee in 1993". She also reported observing in the cemetery of Kalbajar smashed graves "of Azerbaijanis who were buried here before the 1993 Armenian occupation. Some graves were freshly smashed, seemingly by Armenians who left the area last week after 27 years of occupation".

On 16 August 2021, the Azerbaijani President, Ilham Aliyev visited the city and hoisted the flag of Azerbaijan in the city. In september of the same year, the building of the military prosecutor's office, as well as a bakery was opened in Kalbajar. On 26 June 2022, the foundation of the İstisu mineral water plant was laid in Kalbajar.

Historical heritage sites 
Historical heritage sites in and around the town include a petroglyph, a medieval oil mill, a khachkar from 916, and tombstones from between the 13th and 17th centuries.

Demographics

Gallery

References

External links 

 
 World Gazetteer: Azerbaijan – World-Gazetteer.com

Populated places in Kalbajar District
Cities and towns in the Republic of Artsakh